Ek Rishta Aisa Bhi  is an Indian television series broadcast on Sony Pal produced by Shashi Sumeet Productions. Set in the city of Bhopal, the show aired from 1 September 2014 till 13 February 2015.

Story

Sonia lives with her five younger sisters and runs a fancy dress store. After their parents died, Sonia took the responsibility of her sisters. As a result, she has decided to first marry off her sisters and then find someone for herself. The dress store receives an order from leading textile designer Ratna Roy to decorate her house for a festival. Ratna has a son Raghav. A series of misunderstandings leads Sonia's sisters to think that Raghav is Sonia's boyfriend. Pestered by her sisters, Sonia gives in and tells them that his name is Bobby ji even though Raghav and Sonia don't know each other.

Weeks later, Raghav becomes an apprentice to Khan Chacha, who is an old friend of his lost father and also the owner of the restaurant adjacent to Sonia's store. The sisters soon run into Raghav and assume him to be Bobby ji and strike up a friendship with him. Eventually, Sonia reveals the truth to Raghav who promises to help her. With time, they fall in love and are married.

Sonia wins the hearts of Raghav's family members with her sense of duty and love towards everyone in his family. She promises his mother that she will go to any lengths to reunite the family with Raghav's estranged brother, Abhiman. Abhiman and Deepika, Sonia's younger sister, fall in love. On a day when Abhiman is confronted with the truth of his mother's sacrifices for the family, he becomes upset and leaves home but is chased by Sonia and Deepika. Lost in thought, when he is about to be hit by a car, Sonia sacrifices herself to save him and is killed in the accident leaving Raghav, his family, and her sisters heartbroken. Her death leads to Deepika breaking up with Abhiman and Raghav deciding to leave his own home and devote himself to caring for Sonia's sisters.Raghav and sisters moves to sonia's former house as they hates Abhiman who they think is the reason of sonia's death. Abhiman ,who is guilty to be the reason behind the unhappiness in the family decides to bring back Raghav to the house. He tries to help them in various ways but they refuse to forgive him.

Cast

Preeti Chaudhary as Sonia Sharma / Sonia Raghav Roy
 Ekta Kaul
 Rahul Sharma as Raghav Roy
 Amrita Prakash as Deepika Sharma (Deepu) / Deepika Abhimaan Roy
 Divyangana Jain as Rati Sharma
 Farhina Pervez Jarimari as Anjali Sharma
 Divya Naaz as Khushi Sharma
 Palak Dey as Frooti Sharma
 Anshul Trivedi as Abhimaan Roy
 Anjali Mukhi as Ratna Roy, Raghav's mother
 Farida Dadi as Raghav's grandmother
 Susheel Parashar as Raghav's grandfather
 Sheela Sharma as Raghav's bua (aunt)
 Priyamvada Kant as Samaira
 Adaa Khan as Pia
 Gopichand as Kalimuthu Sethupathi
 Nithya Menen as Nithya - to promote Gopichand's film

References

External links

Indian television soap operas
2014 Indian television series debuts
2015 Indian television series endings
Indian drama television series
Hindi-language television shows
Shashi Sumeet Productions series
Sony Pal original programming